Mahuva Junction railway station is a main railway station in Bhavnagar district, Gujarat. Its code is MHV. It will serve Mahuva city. The station has two platforms. It is nearest railhead to Pipavav Port.

Major trains

Following trains start from Mahuva Junction railway station:

 59235/36 Mahuva–Dhola Passenger
 22989/90 Bandra Terminus–Mahuva Express
 22993/94 Bandra Terminus–Mahuva Superfast Express
 59243/44 Mahuva–Rajula Passenger
 59225/26 Mahuva–Bhavnagar Passenger
 12945/46 Surat–Mahuva Superfast Express

References

Railway stations in Bhavnagar district
Bhavnagar railway division
Railway junction stations in Gujarat